Ralph B. "Rip" Owens (December 9, 1894 – August 1970) was a player in the National Football League for the Green Bay Packers in 1922 as a guard. He played at the collegiate level at Lawrence University and the University of Nebraska–Lincoln.

Biography
Owens was born Ralph Owens on December 9, 1894 in Hebron, Wisconsin.

See also
Green Bay Packers players

References

1894 births
1970 deaths
American football offensive guards
Green Bay Packers players
Lawrence Vikings football players
Nebraska Cornhuskers football players
People from Jefferson County, Wisconsin
Players of American football from Wisconsin